Wan Adhan railway station is a closed railway station located in Punjab, Pakistan.

See also
Wan Adhan
Pattoki
Distric Kausar

References

External links

Railway stations in Kasur District
Railway stations on Karachi–Peshawar Line (ML 1)